Jabal Haraz is a mountainous region of Yemen, between Sanaa and Al-Hudaydah, which is considered to be within the Sarat range. In the 11th century, it was the stronghold of the Sulaihid dynasty, many of whose buildings still survive today. It includes Jabal An-Nabi Shu'ayb, the highest mountain in Yemen and the Arabian Peninsula.

History and location 
Because of its location between the Tihamah coastal plain and Sanaa, this mountainous area has always been strategically important. A caravan stopping point during the Himyarite Kingdom, the Haraz was later the stronghold of the Sulayhid dynasty, which was established in Yemen in 1037. Then and subsequently the population have been Ism'aili Shi'ite Muslims.

Haraz is as famous for its fortified villages which cling to nearly inaccessible rocky peaks. Their imposing architecture meets two needs: defending the villagers, while leaving plenty of space for crops. Each town is built like a castle; the houses, themselves, form the wall, equipped with one or two easily defensible doors. Constructed from sandstone and basalt, the buildings are integrated into the landscape and it is difficult to tell where the rock and the village begins or ends. The mountain is divided into terraces of a few acres or more, separated by walls sometimes several meters high. On these terraced fields grow alfalfa for livestock, millet, lentils, large areas for coffee and qat. It is one of the main growing areas of Mocha coffee beans.

Within a day's journey are Bani Murrah and other villages located on the ridge overlooking Manakhah. Manakhah is the heart of mountain range, a large town whose market attracts villagers from the entire neighbourhood. Al Hajjara, to the west of Manakhah, is a walled village whose citadel was founded in the 12th century by the Sulayhids. From there, other villages are accessible, such as Bayt al-Qamus and Bayt Shimran. The village of Hutaib is built on a platform of red sandstone, facing a view of terraced hills which host a score of villages. Here also is the mausoleum of the third Yemeni Da'i al-Mutlaq Hatim ibn Ibrahim. Bohras from India, Sri Lanka, Madagascar and other countries gather here.

World Heritage Status 
This area was added to the UNESCO World Heritage Tentative List on July 8, 2002, in the mixed (cultural and natural) category, as a site that has "outstanding universal value".

Gallery

See also 
 Ad Dahrah, located in the Haraz, the stronghold of the Sulaihid dynasty, many of whose buildings still survive to this day
 Geology of Yemen
 Hajhir Mountains
 Middle East
 Near East

References 

 Lonely Planet

External links 

 Architecture Revived: Architectural Beauty out of Poverty, Jabal Haraz Yemen
 Med-O-Med: Cultural landscapes: Jabal Bura and Jabal Haraz, Yemen
 Jabal Haraz (YouTube)
 Yemen - Haraz Mountains
 Yemen 2008 Jebel Haraz

 
Mountain ranges of mainland Yemen
World Heritage Tentative List